The Breadloaf Wilderness is one of eight wilderness areas in the Green Mountain National Forest in the U.S. state of Vermont. It was created by the Vermont Wilderness Act of 1984 and later expanded by the New England Wilderness Act of 2006. The area is managed by the U.S. Forest Service.

Roughly half of the Breadloaf Wilderness, from its southern boundary at Middlebury Gap to Mount Roosevelt in its interior, was bequeathed to Middlebury College by Joseph Battell (1839–1915), a philanthropist and environmentalist from Middlebury, Vermont, in 1915. The college sold nearly all of Battell's lands to the Forest Service in the 1930s and 1950s. It was the sale of these lands that prompted the Federal government to create the northern unit of the Green Mountain National Forest.

The Long Trail traverses  through the heart of the Breadloaf Wilderness, from Middlebury Gap to Lincoln Gap at its northern edge. Additional access to the wilderness is provided by numerous side trails including (from south to north) the Burnt Hill Trail, the Skylight Pond Trail, the Emily Proctor Trail, the Clark Brook Trail, and the Cooley Glen Trail.

Numerous wildlife species thrive in the wilderness. Moose and black bear are said to be present in considerable numbers. Hikers have observed more than 100 forms of life, including at least 70 species of plants and 25 species of animals.

See also

 List of largest wilderness areas in the United States
 List of wilderness areas of the United States
 National Wilderness Preservation System
 Wilderness Act

References

Wilderness areas of Vermont
IUCN Category Ib
Protected areas of Addison County, Vermont
Green Mountain National Forest
Protected areas established in 1984
1984 establishments in Vermont